Island of the Blue Dolphins is a 1964 American adventure film directed by James B. Clark and written by Jane Klove and Ted Sherdeman. It is based on the 1960 novel Island of the Blue Dolphins by Scott O'Dell. The film stars Celia Kaye, Larry Domasin, Ann Daniel, Carlos Romero, George Kennedy and Hal John Norman. The film was released on July 3, 1964, by Universal Pictures.

The producer and director had previously collaborated on A Dog of Flanders and Misty.

The film was shot in Gualala, California.

Plot
In 1835, a ship crewed by Russian fur hunters and Aleuts come to an island off the coast of Southern California to hunt sea otters. They make a deal with the Nicoleño people living in the village of Ghalas-at for permission to hunt on their lands, but later try to leave without paying. The hunters are then confronted by the village chief and respond with violence. In the ensuing skirmish most of the Nicoleños are slain, forcing the survivors to flee the island. Young Karana, realizing that her 6-year-old brother, Ramo, has been left behind, returns to the island. Karana and Ramo are left alone, menaced by a pack of wild dogs. The most ferocious of the dogs kills Ramo, and Karana teaches herself archery and hunts the dog. She puts an arrow in its chest but then takes pity on the animal and nurses it back to health.

She and the dog, whom she names Rontu, become fast friends. When another group of hunters come to the island, Karana hides, and although Tutok, a girl in the group, finds her and tries to befriend her, Karana refuses to trust anyone. Years pass, and Rontu dies of age. Karana finds a wild dog, that looks like Rontu, and names him Rontu-Aru which means son of Rontu. Later, a boat carrying a missionary arrives, and this time Karana decides to trust the strangers. Taking her animals, Rontu-Aru and some wild birds she has taught to never leave her, she leaves the island.

Cast for main characters 
 Celia Kaye as Karana 
 Larry Domasin as Ramo
 Ann Daniel as Tutok
Carlos Romero as Chowig
George Kennedy as Aleut Captain
 Hal John Norman as Kimki
Julie Payne as Lurai
Martin Garralaga as The Priest
Junior as Rontu

See also
 Il’mena

References

External links
 
 

1964 films
American drama films
Films based on American novels
Films directed by James B. Clark
1964 drama films
Universal Pictures films
Films set in California
Films set on uninhabited islands
Films about dogs
Ventura County, California
Channel Islands of California
Films set in the Pacific Ocean
Films about castaways
Films about Native Americans
Films set in the 1830s
Films scored by Paul Sawtell
1960s English-language films
1960s American films